In enzymology, a 2-coumarate O-beta-glucosyltransferase is an enzyme that catalyzes the chemical reaction

UDP-glucose + trans-2-hydroxycinnamate  UDP + trans-beta-D-glucosyl-2-hydroxycinnamate

Thus, the two substrates of this enzyme are UDP-glucose and trans-2-hydroxycinnamate, whereas its two products are UDP and trans-beta-D-glucosyl-2-hydroxycinnamate.

This enzyme belongs to the family of glycosyltransferases, specifically the hexosyltransferases.  The systematic name of this enzyme class is UDP-glucose:trans-2-hydroxycinnamate O-beta-D-glucosyltransferase. Other names in common use include uridine diphosphoglucose-o-coumarate glucosyltransferase, and UDPG:o-coumaric acid O-glucosyltransferase.  This enzyme participates in phenylpropanoid biosynthesis.

References 

 
 

EC 2.4.1
Enzymes of unknown structure
Hydroxycinnamic acids metabolism